The Men's keirin was held on 21 October 2012. 27 riders participated.

Medalists

Results

Heats
First 2 riders in each heat qualified for the second round, remainder went to first round repechage. It was held at 11:11.

Heat 1

Heat 2

Heat 3

Heat 4

Repechages
First rider in each heat qualify for the second round. It was held at 11:45.

Heat 1

Heat 2

Heat 3

Heat 4

Round 2
First 3 riders in each heat qualified for the final, remainder went to the 7–12 final. It was held at 17:00.

Heat 1

Heat 2

Finals
It was held at 18:09.

Final 7–12 places

Final

References

Men's keirin
European Track Championships – Men's keirin